Mathew David Ryan (born 8 April 1992) is an Australian professional soccer player who plays as a goalkeeper for AZ Alkmaar and captains the Australia national team. 

Born in Sydney, Ryan played youth football for Marconi Stallions, Blacktown City and Central Coast Mariners. He made his senior debut for Blacktown before moving to the Mariners' senior squad in 2010. In 2013, Ryan moved to Club Brugge, where he played for two years before joining Valencia.

He made his senior international debut in 2012, and has since established himself as Australia's first-choice goalkeeper, effectively succeeding his childhood idol Mark Schwarzer. He played at the 2014, 2018, and 2022 World Cups as well as the 2015 and 2019 Asian Cups, winning the Best Goalkeeper award at the 2015 tournament which his country won on home soil.

Early life
Ryan was born in Plumpton, New South Wales and attended Westfields Sports High School. He took up football at the age of four and played youth football for Blacktown City and Central Coast Mariners before making his senior debut with Blacktown City. After moving to Central Coast Mariners in 2010, Ryan moved to Club Brugge in 2013.

In addition to holding an Australian passport, Ryan also has a UK passport.

Club career

Central Coast Mariners

Ryan played for the Central Coast Mariners youth team in the 2009–10 season, and after several call-ups to the senior team, he was given a 3-year senior contract. Despite starting the 2010–11 A-League as the Mariners' substitute keeper, an anterior cruciate ligament injury to first-choice Jess Vanstrattan saw Ryan elevated into the starting eleven. Ryan made his A-League debut for the Mariners on 28 August 2010 in a 1–1 draw against Sydney FC, but fumbled a cross which allowed Rhyan Grant to score Sydney's goal. While coach Graham Arnold was happy with Ryan's debut, there was competition between Ryan and newly-signed Paul Henderson for the regular starting spot. Over the next several months Ryan retained his spot in the starting lineup and earned significant plaudits, including the A-League Young Player of the Month award for December 2010. The Mariners season ended with a penalty shootout loss to Brisbane Roar in the 2011 A-League Grand Final, however, Ryan was awarded the Joe Marston Medal for man of the match in that game. He was also named A-League Young Footballer of the Year for 2010–11.

In October 2011, Ryan was named 2011 Male U20 Player of the Year at the FFA Australian Football Awards. He continued to put in a number of strong performances in the 2011–12 A-League, including a man of the match performance in a 1–0 win over Melbourne Heart on 17 January 2012 after pulling off a number of saves. This contributed to Ryan being named A-League Young Player of the Month for January 2012. The Mariners won the 2011–12 Premiership following a win over Wellington Phoenix in the final round of the regular season. However, they were eliminated in the Preliminary Final against Perth Glory on penalties, despite Ryan scoring his penalty in the shootout. In April 2012, Ryan was named A-League Young Footballer of the Year for the second successive season and A-League Goalkeeper of the Year. He was also awarded the Mariners Medal for club player of the season, and named in the PFA's A-League Team of the Season. He was also awarded the Harry Kewell Medal for the outstanding Australian under-23-year-old player in June 2012.

Ryan was again central to the Mariners' 2012–13 A-League season. In November 2012, he was again awarded FFA Male U20 Player of the Year. On 2 March 2012, Ryan took a penalty in a match against Western Sydney Wanderers which was saved by Ante Covic; the Wanderers won the match 1–0 to move above the Mariners on the A-League table. Coach Graham Arnold revealed after the game that Ryan had been practising penalty-taking in the lead-up to that match following a number of missed penalties from other players in the side. The Mariners were victorious in the 2013 A-League Grand Final over the Wanderers, their first win in their four A-League Grand Finals played, with Ryan dedicating the win to the three previous Mariners teams to have lost at that stage.

Club Brugge 

It was confirmed on 30 May 2013 that Ryan had completed a move to Belgian Pro League side Club Brugge for an undisclosed fee, despite his contract at Central Coast Mariners expiring the following day. On 27 July 2013 Ryan made his debut for Brugge in the first game of the season at home to Sporting Charleroi and kept a clean sheet in a 2–0 win. In a match against K.A.A. Gent on 23 December 2013 Ryan saved a penalty in the 67th minute that would have resulted in game being level at 2–2. Brugge went on to win the game 3–1 and reports after the match confirmed that Ryan had been offered a new lucrative deal with the club involving a substantial pay increase and contract extension. On 26 November 2014, it was announced that Ryan had agreed to terms with Club Brugge, to extend his contract until 2018. 

After a string of fantastic performances, it was reported that European giants Liverpool had sent scouts to the 2015 AFC Asian Cup to watch the goalkeeper. On 22 March 2015, Ryan won the Belgian Cup after keeping the post and helping Club Brugge to a 2–1 victory over Anderlect in the final.

Valencia
On 21 July 2015, Ryan signed a six-year deal with La Liga side Valencia CF. He was expected to assume the starting goalkeeper role, at least in the medium term, with regular starter Diego Alves out with an anterior cruciate ligament injury. He made his unofficial debut in a friendly against PSV Eindhoven on 25 July 2015. On 22 August 2015, Ryan made his La Liga debut in Valencia's opening game of the season, keeping a clean sheet in a scoreless draw with Rayo Vallecano. His run in the starting side extended until September, when he sustained a meniscus tear in a draw with Deportivo La Coruña, forcing him to have surgery and miss over a month of football. A series of good performances from his replacement, Jaume Domènech, led to suggestions that Ryan would not return to the starting side after his return from injury. Indeed, it was not until late November that Ryan was re-promoted to the starting side for a game against Sevilla. Ryan continued to be rotated with Jaume and the returning Alves for the remainder of the season, eventually making 21 appearances for Valencia in all competitions.

Ryan was back in Valencia's starting lineup for the opening matches of the 2016–17 La Liga, with Alves rumored to be seeking an overseas move. However, Alves stayed at Valencia and Ryan subsequently lost his starting position. By January 2017, a number of clubs were interested in Ryan.

Racing Genk (loan)
On 30 January 2017, Ryan returned to Belgium after he was loaned to Racing Genk. He entered the starting squad straight away, playing his first match in a 1–0 loss to Oostende in the Belgian Cup on 31 January 2017. Ryan stated in April 2017 that he was not planning to stay in Belgium after the season and would instead return to Valencia. Ryan played a number of games for Genk in multiple competitions, with the side reaching the quarterfinals of the 2016–17 UEFA Europa League, and the final of the Belgian Europa League playoff.

Brighton & Hove Albion
On 16 June 2017, it was announced that Ryan would sign for newly-promoted Premier League club Brighton & Hove Albion on 1 July 2017 on a five-year contract for an undisclosed fee. He cited the prospect of playing in the Premier League as a main reason for the transfer. Ryan made his debut for Brighton & Hove Albion on 12 August 2017 against Manchester City in a 2–0 defeat. Ryan was in goal for Brighton's first ever Premier League win which came at home against West Brom on 9 September 2017. Ryan played in every single minute of the league in the 2017–18 season keeping 10 clean sheets, one of which coming in a 1–0 home win over Manchester United on 4 May 2018 in which secured Premier League status for the Sussex club.

Ryan kept his first clean sheet of the 2018–19 season in a 1–0 home win over West Ham on the 8th league game of the season. He made two more clean sheets in the next two games, one in a 1–0 away win against Newcastle United and the other in a 1–0 home win against Wolves. In late December and the best part of January Ryan left Brighton for international duty representing Australia in the Asian Cup. His first game back came in a 4–2 away defeat to Fulham on 29 January. He made his FA Cup debut in an eventful match away to Millwall on 17 March. It finished 2–2 with Brighton winning 5–4 on penalties.

2020–21 season: Loan to Arsenal
Ryan was told by Brighton manager Graham Potter in December 2020 that teammate Robert Sánchez would be given an extended run as goalkeeper in the Premier League for the rest of the 2020–21 season and that Ryan would be free to leave in January should the right offer come along.

On 22 January 2021, he joined Arsenal on loan until the end of the season. He was given the number 33 jersey, formerly worn by Matt Macey and Petr Čech at the club. On 6 February, Ryan made his debut for Arsenal covering for suspended Bernd Leno in a 1–0 away loss at Aston Villa. It was more than two months until Ryan's next appearance with Leno being dropped to the bench. Ryan was beaten when Gabriel conceded a penalty with Josh Maja converting from the spot in an eventual 1–1 home draw against a struggling Fulham on 18 April. Ryan played a role in Arsenal's equaliser after going up for a corner. Ryan kept his first Gunners clean sheet in his first win in an Arsenal shirt in a 2–0 away victory at Newcastle United on 2 May, again being chosen over Leno for the second time in four matches.

Real Sociedad
Ryan joined La Liga side Real Sociedad on undisclosed terms on 12 July 2021. He made his debut on 23 September, helping Sociedad to a 3–2 away win over Granada.

Copenhagen
On 9 August 2022, Ryan joined Superliga side FC Copenhagen on a two-year contract.

AZ Alkmaar
Due to a lack of playing time at F.C. Copenhagen, Ryan left the Danish club and signed for Eredivisie club AZ Alkmaar on 9 January 2023. He was given a contract until June 2024.

International career

Youth
Despite not having featured for the side previously, Ryan's strong form in the 2010–11 A-League led to suggestions he would be called up for the Australian under-20 team for the 2011 FIFA U-20 World Cup in mid-2011. However, he missed the tournament after suffering a serious knee injury.

Ryan was first called up for the Australian under-23 side in November 2011. He made his debut for the side in a scoreless draw with Iraq on 22 November 2011. The Olyroos failed to qualify for the 2012 Summer Olympics.

Senior

Ryan received his first call-up to the Socceroos squad for a 2014 FIFA World Cup qualification match against Saudi Arabia in February 2012. Later that year, he was selected in the squad for the second preliminary round of the 2013 EAFF East Asian Cup. He made his senior international debut in a 1–1 draw with North Korea on 5 December 2012.

In November 2013, longtime Australian goalkeeper Mark Schwarzer announced his international retirement following the appointment of new coach Ange Postecoglou, leaving Ryan as one of the contenders to be the new first-choice keeper. Postecoglou identified Ryan and fellow young keeper Mitch Langerak as two of the main candidates for the role.

Ryan was selected in May 2014 in the Australian squad for the 2014 FIFA World Cup. He played in all three of Australia's games as they were eliminated in the group stage after losses to the Netherlands, Chile and Spain. Ryan's own performances in the tournament were mixed, and he described the matches as a "massive learning curve" for himself.

Months later, Ryan was selected for the Australian 2015 AFC Asian Cup squad, to be played in Australia in early 2015. He put in a number of strong performances throughout the tournament as Australia conceded just two goals in reaching the Final against South Korea. Australia claimed their first AFC Asian Cup title after winning 2–1 in extra time. Ryan was named the official Best Goalkeeper for the tournament.

In May 2018 he was named in Australia's 23-man squad for the 2018 World Cup in Russia.

On 15 October 2019, Mathew Ryan captained Australia for the first time, becoming the 62nd player to captain Australia in a 7-1 win over Chinese Taipei. During this game Ryan also became Australia's 2nd most capped Goalkeeper with 58 caps, surpassing Zeljko Kalac.

Career statistics

Club

International

Honours
Central Coast Mariners
A-League Premiership: 2011–12
A-League Championship: 2013

Club Brugge
 Belgian Cup: 2014–15

Australia
AFC Asian Cup: 2015

Individual

 PFA Footballer of the Year: 2014–15, 2018–19

A-League Young Footballer of the Year: 2010–11, 2011–12
A-League Goalkeeper of the Year: 2011–12
Belgium Pro League Goalkeeper of the Year: 2013–14, 2014–15
FFA U20 Male Player of the Year: 2011, 2012
PFA Harry Kewell Medal: 2011–12, 2013–14, 2014–15
PFA A-League Team of the Season: 2011–12
Joe Marston Medal: 2011
Mariners Medal: 2011–12
AFC Asian Cup Golden Glove: 2015
AFC Asian Cup Dream Team: 2015
IFFHS AFC Man Team of the Year: 2020
IFFHS AFC Men's Team of the Decade 2011–2020

References

External links

Maty Ryan writes on PlayersVoice
Mathew Ryan at Aussie Footballers

Mathew Ryan profile Socceroos.com.au

1992 births
Living people
Australian people of Irish descent
Soccer players from Sydney
Australian soccer players
Association football goalkeepers
Marconi Stallions FC players
Blacktown City FC players
Central Coast Mariners FC players
Club Brugge KV players
Valencia CF players
Real Sociedad footballers
K.R.C. Genk players
Brighton & Hove Albion F.C. players
Arsenal F.C. players
F.C. Copenhagen players
AZ Alkmaar players
A-League Men players
Belgian Pro League players
La Liga players
Premier League players
Danish Superliga players
Eredivisie players
Australia international soccer players
2014 FIFA World Cup players
2015 AFC Asian Cup players
2017 FIFA Confederations Cup players
2018 FIFA World Cup players
2019 AFC Asian Cup players
AFC Asian Cup-winning players
Australian expatriate soccer players
Australian expatriate sportspeople in Belgium
Australian expatriate sportspeople in Spain
Australian expatriate sportspeople in England
Australian expatriate sportspeople in Denmark
Australian expatriate sportspeople in the Netherlands
Expatriate footballers in Belgium
Expatriate footballers in Spain
Expatriate footballers in England
Expatriate men's footballers in Denmark
Expatriate footballers in the Netherlands
2022 FIFA World Cup players